VERBIO Vereinigte BioEnergie AG is a German manufacturer and supplier of biofuels headquartered in Zörbig, Saxony-Anhalt. With about 750 employees at three locations the company produces biodiesel, ethanol fuel and biogas on an industrial scale and has developed its own processes.

In the year 1995 Claus Sauter founded a mill for oil-bearing plant components. In May 2006, the previous individual companies merged to form today's Aktiengesellschaft (AG).
On June 4, 2007, the corporation was listed in the ÖkoDAX.

References

Biofuel producers
Companies based in Saxony-Anhalt
Manufacturing companies of Germany